Willow Bunch Airport  was located  north-west of Willow Bunch, Saskatchewan, Canada.

This airfield is permanently closed.

See also 
 List of airports in Saskatchewan
 List of defunct airports in Canada

References 

Defunct airports in Saskatchewan
Willow Bunch No. 42, Saskatchewan